The Yeovil and District Football League is a football competition based in England. It has a total of three divisions including the Yeovil and District League Premier Division which sits at level 14 of the English football league system. It is a feeder to the Somerset County League and is affiliated to the Somerset County FA.

In 1974 Westland-Yeovil progressed from the Y&DFL to the Western Football League where they spent 6 seasons.



Member clubs 2022–23

Premier Division
AFC Strode
Ashcott Reserves 
Castle Cary Reserves
Keinton Park Rangers 
Ilchester Junior
Manor Athletic
Martock United
Odcombe
South Cheriton United 
Stoke Sub Hamdon 
Templecombe Rovers
Wagtail Athletic 

Division One
Barwick 
Bruton United Junior 
Evercrech Sports 
Ilchester Junior Reserves 
Martock United Reserves
Milborne Port Reserves 
Pen Mill Athletic
RLS FC 
South Cheriton United Reserves 
St Crispins 
Team Gryphon 
Wyndham Athletic 

Division Two
AFC Strode Reserves 
Barwick Reserves 
Bullets FC Reds 
Ilchester Junior Colts 
Langport Town FC 
Milborne Port 'A'
Pen Mill Athletic Reserves 
Somerton Town Development Colts 
Stoke Sub Hamdon Reserves 
Team Gryphon Reserves 
Tor

Champions 

Division Three was discontinued after the 2013–14 season.

References

External links
FA Full-time page

Sport in Yeovil
Football leagues in England
Sports leagues established in 1903
1903 establishments in England
Football in Somerset